Pavetta gleniei is a plant commonly found in Sri Lanka.

References
 http://www.theplantlist.org/tpl/record/kew-148503
 https://www.gbif.org/species/109307334
 http://plants.jstor.org/specimen/k000763414

gleniei
Flora of Sri Lanka